Kalpana Lajmi (1954–2018) was an Indian film director, producer and screenwriter. Lajmi was an independent filmmaker working more on realistic, low-budget films, which are known in India as parallel cinema. Her films were often woman-oriented. She had been for a long time manager with Bhupen Hazarika. She was diagnosed with kidney cancer in 2017 and died on 23 September 2018 at the age of 64.

Biography
Kalpana Lajmi was the daughter of painter Lalita Lajmi and Navy Captain Gopi Lajmi. She was niece of filmmaker Guru Dutt, debuted as an assistant director under the veteran film director Shyam Benegal who was also her relative of the Padukone family. She later went on to work as an assistant costume designer in Shyam Benegal's Bhumika: The Role. She made her directorial début with the documentary film D.G. Movie Pioneer in 1978 and went on to direct more documentaries like A Work Study in Tea Plucking (1979) and Along the Brahmaputra (1981). She debuted as a feature film director in 1986 with Ek Pal (A Moment), starring Shabana Azmi,  
Naseeruddin Shah and Farooq Sheikh.  She produced the film, took part in the film writing and had written the screenplay for the film along with Gulzar.

She then took a break from directing movies and went to direct her first television serial Lohit Kinare (1988) starring Tanvi Azmi. She made her comeback to cinema in 1993 with the critically acclaimed Rudaali starring Dimple Kapadia. Kapadia won the National Film Award for Best Actress for her performance and Lajmi also won accolades for directing the film.

Her next film was Darmiyaan: In Between (1997) which was directed and produced by her. The movie starred Kirron Kher and Tabu in pivotal & influential roles.

Her next film in 2001 was Daman: A Victim of Marital Violence. The film was distributed by the Indian Government and was acclaimed by critics. It was the second time that an actress won the National Film Award for Best Actress under Lajmi's directorial hand. This time it was Raveena Tandon, who was not as appreciated before, and Lajmi was credited as being the one to explore the hidden talent in her.

Her next film, Kyon? (2003) was unnoticed, while her last release and her last film was Chingaari in 2006 that starred Sushmita Sen as a village prostitute. Chingaari turned out - to be a commercial box-office flop.

Filmography

References

External links

Rediff interview

1954 births
2018 deaths
Indian women film directors
20th-century Indian film directors
Indian women screenwriters
Hindi-language film directors
Hindi screenwriters
20th-century Indian women writers
20th-century Indian dramatists and playwrights
Screenwriters from Kolkata
Film directors from Kolkata
21st-century Indian film directors
21st-century Indian women writers
21st-century Indian dramatists and playwrights
Indian women film producers
Film producers from Kolkata
Hindi film producers
Women artists from West Bengal
Businesswomen from West Bengal
20th-century Indian businesswomen
20th-century Indian businesspeople
21st-century Indian businesswomen
21st-century Indian businesspeople
Deaths from kidney cancer
Deaths from cancer in India